Asunción Ocasio Rodríguez (born June 6, 1987) is a Puerto Rican taekwondo practitioner. Ocasio qualified for the women's 67 kg class at the 2008 Summer Olympics in Beijing, after placing third from the Pan American Qualification Tournament in Cali, Colombia. She defeated Greece's Elisavet Mystakidou and Germany's Helena Fromm in the first two rounds, before losing out the semi-final match by a unanimous decision to Canada's Karine Sergerie, with a score of 0–2. Ocasio automatically qualified for the bronze medal bout, where she narrowly lost Puerto Rico's first ever medal at these Olympic games by Croatia's Sandra Šarić, with a final score of 1–5.

References

External links

NBC Olympics Profile

Puerto Rican female taekwondo practitioners
1987 births
Living people
Olympic taekwondo practitioners of Puerto Rico
Taekwondo practitioners at the 2008 Summer Olympics
Pan American Games medalists in taekwondo
Pan American Games bronze medalists for Puerto Rico
Taekwondo practitioners at the 2007 Pan American Games
Medalists at the 2007 Pan American Games
21st-century Puerto Rican women